Tillomorphini is a tribe of beetles in the subfamily Cerambycinae, containing the following genera:

 Arawakia
 Bonfilsia
 Calliclytus
 Epipodocarpus
 Epropetes
 Euderces
 Gourbeyrella
 Lamproclytus
 Licracantha
 Mygalobas
 Pentanodes
 Tetranodus
 Tilloglomus
 Tillomorpha

References

 
Cerambycinae